Pierre Cary was a politician, born in Boulogne-Sur-Mer in the Pas-de-Calais in 1793. Coming from a local family of note, he was a landowner in the department, and served as a deputy of the Pas-de-Calais, aligning himself at first with the moderate republicans and later the leftists.  He died in 1857 in the Arrondissement of Béthune.

References

1793 births
1857 deaths
French politicians